The Very Best of The Jacksons (released in Japan under The Very Best of The Jackson 5/The Jacksons: Anthology 1969–1987) is a greatest hits compilation by The Jacksons during their years at Motown as The Jackson 5 to their last single released by Epic Records in 1989. The compilation is a joint release with Universal Music Group, Motown's current parent, and was distributed on July 5, 2004 in the United Kingdom and December 22, 2004 in Japan by Sony Music. Featured are most of the hit singles the group, including their first hit in 1969 "I Want You Back" as well as popular hits such as "ABC", "This Place Hotel" and "Shake Your Body (Down to the Ground)". The compilation also includes songs Michael Jackson released during his solo career at Motown as well as a live recording of his first smash hit at Epic, "Don't Stop 'Til You Get Enough".

The cover art is similar to Number Ones, a similar album consisting of lead singer Michael Jackson's solo career from 1979 to 2003.

Track listing

2009 Playlist edition

Charts

Weekly charts

Year-end charts

Certifications

References

2004 greatest hits albums
The Jackson 5 compilation albums
Epic Records compilation albums